William Matthews (1882–1916) was an English footballer who played as a forward. Born in Derby, Derbyshire, he played for Ripley Athletic, Aston Villa, Notts County, Derby County and Newport County.

References

1882 births
Footballers from Derby
1916 deaths
English footballers
Association football forwards
Aston Villa F.C. players
Notts County F.C. players
Derby County F.C. players
Newport County A.F.C. players
English Football League players